Osman Hung Chi-kit (born 20 March 1979) is a Hong Kong actor and singer-songwriter of the Cantopop group EO2.

Life and career
Hung has appeared in several films, and in 2009 took the joint-lead role in Permanent Residence, playing the character Windson alongside Sean Li.  He also sang the track "Truly Madly Deeply" for the same film. The story is an unconventional choice of subject matter for Hong Kong cinema in both its examination of male homosexual love and the marital strain resulting from self-denial of that love; it examines the 'limits of life', while the second in the trilogy, Amphetamine, explores this theme further in the 'limits of passion'. The third, as yet unreleased, film in the trilogy, Life of an Artist, examines the 'limits of art'.

In Permanent Residence, Hung's character, named Windson, is a straight young man who is befriended by a young gay man, Ivan (played by Sean Li), seeking a long-term relationship. The film is claimed by its director, Scud, to be a largely semi-autobiographical account of his own life.

Unusually for a comparatively well-known performer, and unlike the conventional appearances of adult males in Hong Kong films, Hung appears naked many times in the film, with his private parts fully exposed on camera, together with his co-star Sean Li. Hung later appeared as the character 'Spider' in the 2011 Hong Kong film Love Actually... Sucks!, with his private parts again fully revealed as he walks naked on a mountain top.

Hung appeared in the Hong Kong films Infernal Affairs (2002) and Breezy Summer (2004) with fellow members of his Cantopop group EO2.

Filmography
 He's a Woman, She's a Man (1994) ... Audition contestant #9
 Infernal Affairs (2002) ... one of Triad boss Hon Sam's men
 The New Option (2002) ... Huang's brother
 Snake Charmer (2002) ... senator's son
 Zero (2003) ... Fong Hok-Man
 Give Them a Chance (2003) ... Jack
 Men Suddenly in Black (2003) ... reporter
 Breezy Summer (2004) ... Osman
 Undercover (2007)
 Tactical Unit - No Way Out (2008) ... PC Chung
 Tactical Unit - Partners (2008) ... PTU
 Permanent Residence (2009) ... Windson
 Love Actually... Sucks! (2011) ... Spider

References

1979 births
Living people
Cantonese-language singers
Cantopop singer-songwriters
Hong Kong male film actors
21st-century Hong Kong male singers